Elections to Trafford Council were held on 7 May 1992.  One-third of the council was up for election, with each successful candidate to serve a four-year term of office, expiring in 1996. The Conservative party retained overall control of the council.

After the election, the composition of the council was as follows:

Ward results

References

1992 English local elections
1992
1990s in Greater Manchester